The Physical Society of Iran (PSI) (انجمن فيزيک ايران) is Iran's professional and academic society of physicists. PSI is a non-profit organization aimed at establishing and strengthening scientific contacts between physicists and academic members of the country's institutes of higher education in the field of physics.

The society has over 10,000 members inside and outside Iran. In addition to its awards scheme and publications programme, the Physical Society of Iran holds annual conferences in several different fields, including optics and condensed matter physics. The society has proved instrumental in improving the state of education and research in physics throughout the country.

The society organizes annual meetings and it is an active member of TWAS. It has also close collaboration with the American Physical Society. In October 2003 APS and PSI jointly sponsored a school/workshop on string theory in Tehran.

The society's main journal is the Iranian Journal of Physics Research, which is published via the Isfahan University of Technology Press, and is recognized by the Ministry of Science of Iran. PSI was a sponsor of the 2007 International Physics Olympiad, which was hosted by Isfahan University of Technology.

History

The Physical Society of Iran was established in 1963 by Iran's elite physicists and engineers. Among the founders was Yusef Sobouti, currently chancellor of IASBS.

The first Annual Physics Conference of Iran was inaugurated in 1973 at Sepah Bank's arboretum, followed by Iran's second national conference on Physics the next year at Shahid Beheshti University. Activities of the society suffered a setback during the early years of the revolution, but picked up in 1983 and have been gathering momentum ever since.

Presidents
 Yousef Sobouti (1988–91 and 1996–99)
 Reza Mansouri 
 Hessamaddin Arfaei
 Ezatolah Arzi
 Hadi Akbarzadeh
 Shahin Rouhani
 Mohammad Reza Ejtehadi (current)

Awards
The following are awarded annually by PSI to selected recipients during the Annual Physics Conference awards ceremony:

General
 The Mahmoud Hessabi Award (جايزه حسابی) 
 The PSI Award (جايزه انجمن فيزيک ايران)
 The Educational Apparatus Award (جايزه ساخت دستگاه آموزشی)
 Best Physics Sci-fi Essay Award (جايزه بهترين داستان علمی تخيلی فیزیک)
 Best Physics Teacher Award (جايزه دوسالانه دبير فيزيک برگزيده) (bi-annual)
 Best Conference Poster Award (جايزه پوستر برگزيده کنفرانس فيزيک)
 Best Student Poster Award (جايزه پوستر برگزيده همايش دانشجويی فيزيک)

Secondary Level (high schools)
 Rouzbeh Award (جايزه روزبه)
 Best Proposal Award (جايزه بهترين طرح مسأله)  
 Best Scientific Report Award (جايزه گوياترين گزارش کار)   
 Best Detailed Investigation Award (جايزه دقيق‌ترين توجه به جزئيات)  
 Award for Best Instrumental Application (جايزه مناسب‌ترين بکارگيری ابزار)  
 Award for Best Error Calculation and Analysis (جايزه صحيح‌ ترين محاسبه و تحليل خطا) 
 Best Conclusion Award (جايزه کامل‌ ترين نتيجه‌ گيری)

See also
Higher education in Iran
Institute of Biochemistry and Biophysics

References

External links

IranPhO (Iran Physics Olympiads)

Physics societies
Professional associations based in Iran
1963 establishments in Iran